Cerreto Laziale is a  (municipality) in the Metropolitan City of Rome in the Italian region of Latium, located about  east of Rome.

Origins of the name 
According to some, the name of the town refers to Mount “Cerretum”, near which the town is located. According to others, it derives from the Latin “Quercus cerris”, ie Turkey oak (since, previously, the territory where the town now stands was covered with Turkey oaks) with the addition of the collective suffix “-etum” which indicates abundance.

References

Cities and towns in Lazio